Mordellistena longicauda is a beetle in the genus Mordellistena of the family Mordellidae. It was described in 1930 by Ray.

References

longicauda
Beetles described in 1930